Bill Jackson Tchato Mbiayi (born 14 May 1975) is a Cameroonian former professional footballer who played as a defender. He played for Caen, Valence, Nice, Montpellier, 1. FC Kaiserslautern, Qatar SC, Al-Khor and Strasbourg and Sapins. Tchato represented Cameroon at international level, making 46 appearances over an eight-year period, scoring one goal.

Club career
Tchato began his career in France with Caen in 1995, and made 18 league appearances in his debut season which ended with the club being promoted to Division 1 as champions. He was transferred to Valence in 1996, where he made 69 league appearances and scored six goals over the next two years. In 1998, he joined OGC Nice, scoring three goals in 70 league appearances during his time with the club. Tchato was signed by Montpellier in 2000 and he helped them gain promotion to Division 1 in his first season. He made 63 league appearances for the club before moving to Germany in 2003 to play for Bundesliga side FC Kaiserslautern. In 2005, he returned to Nice for one season and then moved to the Middle East to play for Qatar SC. Two years later, he joined Al-Khor. Tchato returned to France in 2010 with Championnat National team Strasbourg. A year later, having seen Strasbourg relegated due to financial problems, Tchato moved to Gabon to join First Division club Sapins.

International career
He made his debut for the Cameroon national team in 2000. He represented his country at the 2002 FIFA World Cup, and the African Cup of Nations in the same year, which Cameroon won. Tchato appeared in two FIFA Confederations Cup competitions, in 2001 and 2003. He also played in the 2004 and 2008 African Cup of Nations, where Cameroon were defeated by Egypt in the final.

Personal life
Born in M'Biam, Tchato moved to Europe at a young age with his parents, who worked for the Embassy of Cameroon in Paris, and subsequently in London.

Bill's son Enzo is also a professional footballer, and plays for Montpellier.

Honors
Cameroon

Africa Cup of Nations runner-up:2008

References

External links

Bill Tchato statistics
BBC: World Cup 2002

1975 births
Living people
Association football defenders
Cameroonian footballers
Cameroon international footballers
Cameroonian expatriate footballers
2001 FIFA Confederations Cup players
2002 FIFA World Cup players
2003 FIFA Confederations Cup players
2002 African Cup of Nations players
2004 African Cup of Nations players
2008 Africa Cup of Nations players
Stade Malherbe Caen players
ASOA Valence players
OGC Nice players
Montpellier HSC players
Ligue 1 players
Ligue 2 players
Cameroonian expatriate sportspeople in France
Expatriate footballers in France
1. FC Kaiserslautern players
Bundesliga players
Cameroonian expatriate sportspeople in Germany
Expatriate footballers in Germany
Qatar SC players
Al-Khor SC players
Expatriate footballers in Qatar
Cameroonian expatriate sportspeople in Qatar
RC Strasbourg Alsace players
Qatar Stars League players
Sapins FC players
Expatriate footballers in Gabon